The 2018 Damallsvenskan was the 30th season of the Swedish women's association football top division, Damallsvenskan. It began on 14 April 2018 and ended on 27 October the same year. Linköpings FC were the defending champions, having won the competition in 2017.

Piteå IF won the series, and so also their first Swedish National Championship title.

Teams 

Note: 1 According to each club information page at the Swedish Football Association website for Damallsvenskan.

League table

Attendance

Home attendances

Updated to games played on 20 May 2018.

Highest attendances

Updated to games played on 27 October 2018.

Top scorers
.

References

External links 
 Season at soccerway.com

Damallsvenskan seasons
Sweden
2018 in Swedish association football leagues
2018 in Swedish women's football